Gero Zambuto (1887 – 1944) was an Italian actor, screenwriter and film director.

Selected filmography

 Fedora (1913)
 When Knights Were Bold (1916)
 La Moglie di Claudio (1918)
 Hedda Gabler (1920)
 Emperor Maciste (1924)
 Hands Off Me! (1937)
 The Fornaretto of Venice (1939)
 Music on the Run (1943)
 Macario Against Zagomar (1944)

References

Bibliography
 Goble, Alan. The Complete Index to Literary Sources in Film. Walter de Gruyter, 1999.

External links

1887 births
1944 deaths
People from Grotte, Sicily
Italian male film actors
Italian male silent film actors
20th-century Italian male actors
20th-century Italian screenwriters
Italian male screenwriters
Italian film directors
Actors from Sicily
Film people from Sicily
20th-century Italian male writers